Katosan may refer to the following entities :

 Katosan State, a former princely state in Mahi Kantha
 its seat, now a village in Mehsana District, Gujarat 
 Katosan Thana, a neighbouring separate jurisdiction in Mahi Kantha

See also 
 Kato (-san), a Japanese surname